Stream of Life is a 2012 bronze sculpture installed at Salt Lake City's City Creek Center, in the U.S. state of Utah. The artwork commemorates the state's wildlife and depicts several animals.

References

2012 sculptures
Animal sculptures in the United States
Bronze sculptures in Utah
Outdoor sculptures in Salt Lake City